Chimera is the third album by the progressive metal band Andromeda, released in 2006.

The album was reviewed and received scores of 7/10 from Rockhard.de, and 8.5/10 from Metal Express Radio.

Track listing
 "Periscope"  – 6:11
 "In the End"  – 4:58
 "The Hidden Riddle"  – 5:51
 "Going Under"  – 6:27
 "The Cage of Me"  – 7:08
 "No Guidelines"  – 6:23
 "Inner Circle"  – 7:03
 "Iskenderun"  – 5:30
 "Blink of an Eye"  – 9:29
 "Chameleon Carnival" (Live)  – 5:12 (Bonus. Japanese edition only)

Personnel

Band
Johan Reinholdz - Guitars
David Fremberg - Vocals
Fabian Gustavsson - Bass
Thomas Lejon - Drums
Martin Hedin - Keyboards and backing vocals

Other
Andromeda - Engineer
Patrik Ekeblom - Engineer
Martin Hedin - Mastering and mixing
David Fremberg - Layout
Niklas Sundin - Artwork
Daniel Andersson  - Photos

References

Metalinside.de review
Metal-Temple review
Metal.it review (in Italian)
Metalist.il review (in Hebrew)

2006 albums
Andromeda (Swedish band) albums
Massacre Records albums